Stanislav Nenashev (born 18 March 1934 in Baku, Azerbaijani SSR) is a Soviet athlete who was a world record holder (12 December 1954 - 4 August 1955) in the hammer throw (64.05 m). In 1950, Nenashev was ranked as ninth among track and field athletes in the Soviet Union. Despite having broken the world record, Nenashev was never selected to represent the Soviet Union at the Olympic Games.

External links 
 Profile at trackfield.brinkster.net

References 

1934 births
Living people
Sportspeople from Baku
Azerbaijani male hammer throwers
Soviet male hammer throwers
World record setters in athletics (track and field)